Phantom Phorce is a remix album of Super Furry Animals' 2003 record Phantom Power. The remixes had previously appeared on the DVD version of Phantom Power—they were re-released as Phantom Phorce on the band's own Placid Casual label as a way of ensuring the remixers would receive royalties for the tracks. The album features a commentary from the fictional 'Kurt Stern' who appears between songs to discuss the re-recording of Phantom Power under his guidance after being unhappy with the original. First editions of the album came packaged in a case that doubled as a paper model of a video game arcade cabinet, and included a bonus CD; the Slow Life EP. Critical reaction to Phantom Phorce was generally positive.

Origins, concept and music

Phantom Phorce features remixes previously available on the DVD version of Phantom Power. According to drummer Dafydd Ieuan the band didn't have the money to pay the artists involved for these remixes so, in order to provide them with royalties, promised to release an album featuring the tracks on their own label.

The record features remixes of every track from 2003's Phantom Power presented in sequence, along with extra versions of "Valet Parking" and "Hello Sunshine" which appear at the end of the album. The remixes vary from radical reworkings such as Killa Kella's beatbox treatment of "Golden Retriever" and Wauvenfold's "unrecognisable" version of "Sex, War and Robots", to the likes of Mario Caldato Jr's take on "Liberty Belle" and High Llamas' "Valet Parking" which are merely "spruced up".

The remixes are interspersed with anecdotes from 'Kurt Stern' (actually the band's road manager) who supposedly made the decision to make these remixes after being unhappy with the original Phantom Power. According to bassist Guto Pryce this "running commentary is tongue in cheek, it's our road manager pretending to be a producer, and he ends up sounding like a... twat!" These anecdotes give the actual release a different track listing from that which appears on the back of the album.

Release and reception

Initial copies of the album came bundled with the Slow Life EP in packaging which could be folded into the shape of a video game arcade cabinet, or "personal console" as described on the instructions section of the sleeve. The CDs themselves were housed in individual sleeves designed to look like 3.5" floppy disks. Zeth Lundy, reviewing the album for PopMatters, commented that he constructed the arcade cabinet with "sheer geeky delight" while CokeMachineGlow called the packaging "nostalgic but infuriating". Phantom Phorce was also issued on gold-coloured vinyl.

Critical reaction to Phantom Phorce was generally positive with Uncut stating that the album features an "inspired overhaul" of tracks from Phantom Power, the Western Mail describing the record as a "mind-bending collection that radically re-works each track from the original record to create something entirely different, but equally appealing" and musicOMH calling it "an innovative and thoroughly enjoyable set of remixes". Some reviews pointed out that the album compares favourably with other remix albums with The Guardian calling Phantom Phorce "stimulating and often rather beautiful, bucking the trend set by most other self-indulgent and pointless remix albums" and the NME stating that "hearing a rock band get the remix treatment is usually a mildly diverting experience rather than a life-changing one. So it's an extremely pleasant surprise to be faced with a whole album of the buggers ... and be thoroughly entertained." Q stated that the commentary by 'Kurt Stern' was one of the best features of the album and The Times expressed surprise that these "'amusing interludes' between tracks are actually funny", however Pitchfork Media found that 'Stern' "gets in the way more than he helps" and claimed that, by the time the listener had heard the full album he or she would "likely consider redubbing it without ['Stern's'] contributions". Reviewing Phantom Phorce for DiSCORDER magazine, Jordie Yow called it "good, but not exceptional" and claimed that the remixes simply made him want to listen to the original versions of the tracks while website Angry Ape was scathing, calling the album a "bland & uninspiring package to put you off remixes for life" and suggested that it was merely a "cash-in" by the band.

Track listing

Personnel
The following people contributed to Phantom Phorce:

Band
Gruff Rhys – Lead vocals, rhythm guitar
Huw Bunford – Lead guitar, backing vocals
Guto Pryce – Bass guitar
Cian Ciaran – Keyboards, backing vocals
Dafydd Ieuan – Drums, backing vocals

Remixers

Weevil
Mario Caldato Jr.
Killa Kela
Wauvenfold
Four Tet
Massimo
Boom Bip
Bravecaptain

Zan Lyons
Minotaur Shock
High Llamas
Llwybr Llaethog
Sir Doufous Styles
Force Unknown
Freiband

Additional musicians

Jonathan 'Catfish' Thomas – pedal steel guitar on tracks 4, 13
Kris Jenkins – percussion on tracks 1, 5, 6, 7, 9, 13, 14, 15
Rachel Thomas – backing vocals on tracks 3, 4
Gary Alsebrook – trumpet on tracks 6, 7
Savio Pacini – trombone on tracks 6, 7
Rico Rodriguez – trombone on track 13
Eddie Thornton – trumpet on track 13
Ray Carless – saxophone on track 13

Marcus Holdway – cello on tracks 4, 7, 13, 14
Sally Herbert – violin on tracks 4, 7, 14
Brian G. Wright – violin on tracks 4, 7, 14
Gill Morley – violin on tracks 4, 7, 14
Ellen Blair – violin on tracks 4, 7, 14
Pete Fowler – Kaoss flanges on track 14
Neil McFarland – Kaoss flanges on track 14

Artwork
Pete Fowler – Illustration & design
John Mark James – Illustration & design

References

External links

Phantom Phorce at YouTube (streamed copy where licensed)

Super Furry Animals albums
2004 remix albums
Albums with cover art by Pete Fowler